Hans Lüssow (born 10 February 1942 in Greifswald) is a retired German Vizeadmiral and former Inspector of the Navy from 1998 until 2003.

References

External links 
 

1942 births
Vice admirals of the German Navy
Living people
People from Greifswald
Chiefs of Navy (Germany)
Military personnel from Mecklenburg-Western Pomerania